The Catoctin Creek Bridge crosses over Catoctin Creek in Loudoun County, Virginia.

It currently carries Virginia Route 673, also known as Featherbed Lane. The bridge was originally located at a crossing of nearby Goose Creek, carrying the Leesburg Turnpike, later Virginia State Route 7, but was relocated in 1932 to its present location at Catoctin Creek.

The Catoctin Creek Bridge was placed on the National Register of Historic Places on June 24, 1974.

Description
The Catoctin Creek Bridge is a nine-panel iron Pratt truss bridge, first erected about 1889. The bridge was fabricated by the Variety Iron Works of Cleveland, Ohio. The deck is made of  timbers.

The Catoctin Creek Bridge is one of the longest metal truss bridges of the 19th century remaining in Virginia.

See also
List of bridges documented by the Historic American Engineering Record in Virginia
List of bridges on the National Register of Historic Places in Virginia

References

External links

Buildings and structures in Loudoun County, Virginia
Bridges completed in 1889
1889 establishments in Virginia
Road bridges on the National Register of Historic Places in Virginia
National Register of Historic Places in Loudoun County, Virginia
Relocated buildings and structures in Virginia
Historic American Engineering Record in Virginia
Iron bridges in the United States
Pratt truss bridges in the United States